The Infinite is the 19th album by the trumpeter Dave Douglas. It was released on the RCA label in 2002 and has performances by Douglas, Chris Potter, Uri Caine, James Genus and Clarence Penn.

Reception

The Allmusic review by Dave Lynch awarded the album 3 stars stating, "The Infinite is a strong debut release from Douglas' New Quintet. Those with tastes tending toward post-bop and pre-fusion jazz should find much to like here, with the album perhaps serving as an entry point to the trumpeter's more chance-taking endeavors". On All About Jazz, C. Andrew Hovan wrote, "The Infinite is the record I've been waiting for Dave to make for some time now. It's not too left of center, has a drummer on board, and allows Douglas' own eclectic sense of musical adventure to run wild."

Track listing
All compositions by Dave Douglas except as indicated
 "Poses" (Rufus Wainwright) - 5:38
 "The Infinite" - 6:34
 "Penelope" - 9:15
 "Crazy Games" (Mary J. Blige, Kenneth Dickerson) - 4:38
 "Waverly" - 7:23
 "Yorke" - 6:18
 "Unison" (Björk) - 5:01
 "Deluge" - 5:43
 "Argo" - 3:35

Personnel
Dave Douglas – trumpet
Chris Potter – tenor saxophone, bass clarinet
Uri Caine – Fender Rhodes 
James Genus – bass
Clarence Penn – drums

References

2002 albums
Dave Douglas (trumpeter) albums
RCA Records albums